Ju Qiansheng (born May 1962) is a general (Shangjiang) of the People's Liberation Army (PLA). He is the current commander of the People's Liberation Army Strategic Support Force.

Biography
Born in Baoji, Shaanxi, in May 1962, Ju graduated from Xidian University. He was commander of the Network System Department of the People's Liberation Army Strategic Support Force. In June 2021 he was promoted to become commander of the People's Liberation Army Strategic Support Force.

He was promoted to the rank of lieutenant general (zhongjiang) in July 2019 and general (Shangjiang) in July 2021.

References

1962 births
Living people
People from Baoji
Xidian University alumni
People's Liberation Army generals from Shaanxi
Members of the 20th Central Committee of the Chinese Communist Party